Amar Raj (Hindi:अमर राज) is a Bollywood film. It was released in 1946.

Cast
 Naseem Jr.
 Trilok Kapoor as Kamal
 Rehana
 H.Prakash
 Nirupa Roy

References

External links
 

1946 films
1940s Hindi-language films
Films directed by Homi Wadia
Indian musical drama films
1940s musical drama films
Indian black-and-white films
1946 drama films